Foley Thomas Beach (born October 31, 1958) is an American bishop. He is the second primate and archbishop of the Anglican Church in North America, a church associated with the Anglican realignment movement. Foley was elected as the church's primate on June 21, 2014. His enthronement took place on October 9, 2014. He is married to Alison and they have two adult children.

Early life and ministry 
Beach was born on October 31, 1958, in Atlanta, Georgia. He studied at Georgia State University in Atlanta, receiving a B.A. degree in 1980. A member of the Episcopal Church, Beach worked as a youth minister at the Episcopal Cathedral of Saint Philip, in Atlanta, from 1980 to 1987, and a lay associate at the Church of the Apostles, in Atlanta, from 1987 to 1989. Beach is a graduate of the School of Theology of the University of the South, where he received an M.Div. degree in 1992. He was ordained a deacon and a priest in the Episcopal Diocese of Atlanta in 1992. He was nominated deacon, afterwards rector, of St. Alban's Episcopal Church, in Monroe, Georgia, where he served from 1992 to 2004. He left the Episcopal Church following the consecration of Gene Robinson as the first openly non-celibate gay bishop of the Anglican Communion. He was later deposed as a priest (sometimes referred to as defrocking) by the Episcopal Diocese of Atlanta in July 2004.

Beach is the first bishop of the Anglican Diocese of the South, a newly formed diocese of the Anglican Church in North America (ACNA), as well as rector and pastor of Holy Cross Anglican Church in Loganville, Georgia, since its founding, from February 2004 to December 2013. It became the diocese's pro-cathedral in 2010, and it is now the cathedral church of both the Anglican Diocese of the South and of ACNA's primate. After the formation of ACNA in June 2009, Beach was elected the leader of a group of parishes in the Southeast and was consecrated as the first bishop of the Diocese of the South on October 9, 2010. Beach has a daily devotional teaching ministry, A Word from the Lord, which is dedicated to "share(ing) Biblical teaching using the instruments of radio, print, the Internet, and satellite technology so that people might discover the living Jesus for themselves and become more faithful followers of Jesus by hearing and applying the Word of God in their lives."

Archbishop of ACNA 
Beach was elected the second archbishop of the Anglican Church in North America after a three-day conclave held at the crypt of the Roman Catholic Basilica of St. Vincent Archabbey, in Latrobe, Pennsylvania.  The contentious vote finally ended "unanimously" with all votes ultimately going to Beach after the multiple balloting that took place over the three-day conclave, on June 21, 2014. "Over the course of three days of intense conversation and sometimes vigorous fellowship [disagreement] and in the end we were all clear where we were headed and the person who could best lead us there was ... Foley Beach," said Archbishop Emeritus Robert Duncan following the election of Beach.
He took office at the conclusion of the provincial assembly of ACNA on June 25, 2014. His investiture took place at the Church of the Apostles in Atlanta, Georgia, on October 9, 2014, with an attendance of 2,000 people and seven Anglican archbishops who afterwards recognized him as a fellow primate and archbishop of the Anglican Communion. However, according to the traditional instruments of communion and the Archbishop of Canterbury, ACNA is not a member of the Anglican Communion.

Beach opposes the ordination of women, unlike his predecessor, but subscribes to the right of each diocese to their own decision on the matter. He is keen in following Robert Duncan's main prerogatives, including social engagement, church planting, ecumenism and full integration into the Anglican Communion, with the support of the Fellowship of Confessing Anglicans and the Global South.

Shortly after his investiture, Beach held an eighteen-day journey that took him to the Church of the Province of South East Asia, the Church of the Province of Myanmar and the Anglican Diocese of Sydney, from November 11–29, 2014. The main purpose of the journey was to strengthen the ties between ACNA and these three Anglican realignment churches. He first visited the Church of the Province of South East Asia, from November 11–14, 2014, where he took part with a 37-member delegation of the ACNA at a mission consultations roundtable held at St. Andrew's Cathedral in Singapore, also meeting Archbishop Bolly Lapok and visiting both Singapore and Malaysia. He followed this with a visit to the Church of the Province of Myanmar, where he was welcomed by Archbishop Stephen Than Myint Oo, and to the Anglican Diocese of Sydney, meeting Archbishop Glenn Davies, who invited him to preach at St. Andrew's Cathedral in Sydney.

During a meeting of the Anglican Primates of the Global South, a coalition representing the majority of the world's Anglicans, from October 14–16, 2015, in Cairo, Egypt, Beach was seated as a member of the Global South Primates Council with voice and vote, and he will continue to have voice and vote in future meetings.

Beach was invited by the Archbishop of Canterbury, Justin Welby, to the Anglican Communion primates' gathering that took place on January 11–15, 2016.

He announced on the same day that the Scottish Episcopal Church voted to approve same-sex marriage, on June 8, 2017, that the Rev. Canon Andy Lines would be consecrated Missionary Bishop to Europe at the ACNA's Third Provincial Assembly, in Wheaton, Illinois, taking place on June 30, 2017, on behalf of the Global Anglican Future Conference (GAFCON).

At the conclusion of GAFCON III, in June 2018 in Jerusalem, it was announced that, in early 2019, Beach would succeed Nicholas Okoh, Primate of the Church of Nigeria, as chair of GAFCON's primates council.

Beach visited England, Wales and Scotland, on October 24–31, 2018, where he was accompanied by Bishop Andy Lines of the Anglican Mission in England. He preached at several Anglican churches to express his full support for the Anglican realignment in Great Britain and Ireland. He also met Christopher Cocksworth, Bishop of Coventry, responsible for the Church of England project "Living in Love & Faith".

He visited Pakistan in November 2019, at the invitation of the Kul Masalak Ulama Board Leadership, where he met Moderator Humphrey Peters and Bishop Azad Marshall, of the Church of Pakistan. He also was present in an interfaith gathering with Muslim scholars in Lahore on 19 November 2019.

References

External links
 Diocese of the South
 Foley Beach audio ministry

1958 births
Living people
Bishops of the Anglican Church in North America
21st-century Anglican archbishops
People from Loganville, Georgia
Georgia State University alumni
Gordon–Conwell Theological Seminary alumni
Sewanee: The University of the South alumni
Evangelical Anglicans
Anglican realignment people
20th-century Anglican theologians
21st-century Anglican theologians